The South African national rugby sevens team competes in the World Rugby Sevens Series, the Rugby World Cup Sevens, the Summer Olympic Games and the Commonwealth Games. Overall, the team has won the World Rugby Sevens Series 4 times, as well as having won 40 tournaments in the series.

History
After readmission to international sport following the ending of the apartheid ban, the team played their first sevens series in the 1993 Hong Kong Sevens, and also participated in the 1993 Rugby World Cup Sevens. They also played in the Hong Kong Sevens for the next two seasons. In 1996, they also took part in the Punta Del Este Sevens in Uruguay and the Dubai Sevens.

They participated in the 1997 Rugby World Cup Sevens the following year as well as in 1998, they played three South American tournaments – the Mar Del Plata Sevens in Argentina, the Punta Del Este Sevens and the Viña del Mar Sevens in Chile.
1999 saw them participate in the Mar Del Plata Sevens, the Santiago Sevens in Chile, the Fiji Sevens, the Hong Kong Sevens, the Japan Sevens and the Paris Sevens.

At the end of 1999, the first World Rugby Sevens Series (then the IRB Sevens World Series) started and the team have been participating in that series ever since.
In addition to the Sevens Series, they also played in the Rugby World Cup Sevens, the Commonwealth Games, the World Games and, from 2016 onwards, the Olympic Games.

The team's nickname, "Blitzboks", is derived from "blitz" an Afrikaans word meaning lightning, and the derivative of Springbok ("Bok"), the official emblem of the South African rugby team.

Tournament history

Summer Olympics

Rugby World Cup Sevens

Commonwealth Games

World Games

World Rugby Sevens Series

Series wins
South Africa won the following editions on the Sevens World Series since its inception in 1999–2000:

Series tournament wins
South Africa won the following tournaments on the Sevens World Series since its inception in 1999–2000:

40 Tournament wins (up to 06/12/2022)

Current season

Players

Current squad

The following players featured in the 2018–19 World Rugby Sevens Series:

Previous squads

The previous South African Sevens squads are as follows:

Player records
The following tables show the leading career South Africa players based on statistics from the World Rugby Sevens Series. Players in bold are still active.

References

External links
Official website
WorldRugby profile

 
National rugby sevens teams
sevens
national